Jindowal is a village in Shaheed Bhagat Singh Nagar district of Punjab State, India. The village is administrated by Sarpanch an elected representative of the village.

Demography 
As of 2011, Jindowal has a total number of 263 houses and population of 1287 of which 652 include are males while 635 are females according to the report published by Census India in 2011. The literacy rate of Jindowal is 82.08%, higher than the state average of 75.84%. The population of children under the age of 6 years is 151 which is 11.97% of total population of Jindowal, and child sex ratio is approximately 855 as compared to Punjab state average of 846.

Almost 62% of the population are Jatt Sikh's. Majority of them are Banga, Chahal, Jindowal, Mahal. Less than half of the population is Schedule Caste which constitutes 38.00% of total population. The town does not have any Schedule Tribe population so far.

As per the report published by Census India in 2011, 402 people were engaged in work activities out of the total population of Jindowal which includes 348 males and 54 females. Many families has migrated to foreign countries but still hold their ancestral land. According to census survey report 2011, 96.27% workers describe their work as main work and 3.73% workers are involved in Marginal activity providing livelihood for less than 6 months.

Education 
The village has a Punjabi medium, co-ed primary school founded in 1955. The schools provide mid-day meal as per Indian Midday Meal Scheme. As per Right of Children to Free and Compulsory Education Act the school provide free education to children between the ages of 6 and 14. Sikh National College Banga and Amardeep Singh Shergill Memorial college Mukandpur are the nearest colleges.

Landmarks and history 
The village has a historical Sikh shrine Gurudwara Charan Kanwal which was built by Maharaja Ranjit Singh in the memory of sixth Guru Hargobind Singh. Guru Hargobind Singh came to this village while on his way from Phagwara to Kirtarpur and stayed here for few days after killing Pende Khan in the last battle.

The village was named after a zamindar Jeeva whom Guru Hargobind Singh gave the blessing of milk while his stay in this village.

Transport 

See also 
List of villages in India

References

External links 
 Tourism of Punjab
 Census of Punjab
 Locality Based PINCode

Villages in Shaheed Bhagat Singh Nagar district